Hopewell is an unincorporated community in Yamhill County, Oregon, United States.

Hopewell post office was established in 1897, and closed out to Amity in 1903. Hopewell is now served by the Salem post office. The name Hopewell does not appear in the gazetteers of the 1880s.

Hopewell was the home of George K. Gay, who voted in the May 1843 Champoeg Meeting that created the provisional government, and built the first brick residence in the state of Oregon near Hopewell in 1842. Gay's great-grandson, singer Johnnie Ray, spent his early years  in Hopewell.

References

External links
Historic images of Hopewell from Salem Public Library

Unincorporated communities in Yamhill County, Oregon
1897 establishments in Oregon
Populated places established in 1897
Unincorporated communities in Oregon